Regional elections were held in Spain in 1983 to elect the regional parliaments of thirteen of the seventeen autonomous communities (namely, Aragon, Asturias, the Balearic Islands, the Canary Islands, Cantabria, Castile and León, Castilla–La Mancha, Extremadura, La Rioja, Madrid, Murcia, Navarre and the Valencian Community). 764 of 1,139 seats in the regional parliaments were up for election. The 6 May 1983 elections were held simultaneously with local elections all throughout Spain.

The Spanish Socialist Workers' Party (PSOE) emerged as the largest party in 11 out of the 13 autonomous communities holding elections, reaching or nearing the absolute majority in 9 (Aragon, Asturias, Castilla–La Mancha, Castile and León, Extremadura, La Rioja, Madrid, Murcia and Valencian Community) and winning a plurality in the Canary Islands and Navarre. The conservative People's Coalition (AP–PDP–UL) was victorious in the Balearic Islands and Cantabria, securing a majority of seats in the later. The Communist Party of Spain (PCE) saw an improvement of its results over those obtained in the October 1982 general election, while other minor national parties, such as the Democratic and Social Centre (CDS) and the Liberal Democratic Party (PDL) failed to make significant inroads.

The elections resulted in the full institutionalization—for the first time in the history of Spain—of an administrative structure of political power between that of the state and of the local councils, represented in the figure of the new autonomous communities.

Regional governments
The following table lists party control in autonomous communities.

Overall results

Summary by region

Aragon

Asturias

Balearics

Canary Islands

Cantabria

Castile and León

Castilla–La Mancha

Extremadura

La Rioja

Madrid

Murcia

Navarre

Valencian Community

Notes

References

External links
www.juntaelectoralcentral.es (in Spanish). Central Electoral Commission – Regional elections
www.argos.gva.es (in Spanish). Argos Information Portal – Electoral Historical Archive
www.historiaelectoral.com (in Spanish and Catalan). Electoral History – Regional elections since 1980

1983
1983 regional elections in Spain